Gonubalabala Island (on maps as Gona Bara Bara) is an island on the southern side of East Channel, Milne Bay Province, Papua New Guinea.
It is located South east of Logea Island.
It is a home island of the Mailulu clan.

Administration 
The island is part of Logea South Ward, Bwanabwana Rural Local Level Government Area LLG, Samarai-Murua District, which are in Milne Bay Province.

History 
Home to the Mailulu clan for at least 6 generations. They have been and remain stewards of the land as well as the reef. For over 100 years they have observed the habits of manta rays which gather in larger numbers just off shore.

Geography 
The island is part of the Doini group, itself a part of Samarai Islands of the Louisiade Archipelago.

Economy 
In addition to wood working and guiding divers/snorkelers on the reef and nearby islands, the Mailulu clan offer home stays in private, handbuilt bungalows. Reef fees are required for anchoring live aboards.

Coordinate home stays with the islanders directly at time of anchoring or make the connection in advance through the front desks of Driftwood or Napatana Lodge in Alotau.  
Home stays, diving and snorkeling are possible year round. 

Manta rays arrive at a large coral bommie for cleaning by smaller fish when the underwater current is strong. 
Best conditions and times for a strong current / Manta Ray cleaning, as observed by the Mailulu, are:  
 Every month during a full moon and just after a full moon
 The months of June, July and August — when there is less rain
 During low tides any time of any month

Transportation 
Dinghy from Alotau takes about 90 minutes. Arrange at Sanderson Bay in Alotau. Liveaboard charter boats often anchor off island. Shore entry, no dock.

References

Islands of Milne Bay Province
Louisiade Archipelago